Mi Marathi was established as a small family owned business in 1985, the Gautam Adhikari &  Makrand Adhikari led the company for a ten-year span. In 1985 the  company was listed on the BSE and NSE, making SAB the first ever Television Company to be publicly list. Mi Marathi programming primarily consists of family dramas, cooking shows, news and movies. Currently 26 serials of Mi Marathi channel are being rebroadcast on Fakt Marathi channel.

Programming

Fiction

Monday to Saturday

8:30 pm – 9:00 pm

9:00 pm – 10:00 pm

10:00 pm

Non-Fiction

List of Rebroadcast Serials on Fakt Marathi Channel

External links
Mi Marathi website
Mi Marathi Twitter

References

Television stations in Mumbai
Mass media in Mumbai
Mass media in Maharashtra
Marathi-language television channels